Thomas Christopher Burn (29 November 1888 – 23 July 1976) was an England amateur footballer who played at the 1912 Summer Olympics. He was part of the Great Britain team, which won the gold medal in the football tournament. He played in all three of the games against Hungary, Finland and Denmark. He played his club football for London Caledonians F.C. He also played in the English FA XI tour of South Africa in 1920.

References

1888 births
1976 deaths
English footballers
English Olympic medallists
England amateur international footballers
Footballers at the 1912 Summer Olympics
Olympic footballers of Great Britain
Olympic gold medallists for Great Britain
Olympic medalists in football
Medalists at the 1912 Summer Olympics
Association football defenders